The 153rd (Wellington) Battalion, CEF was a unit in the Canadian Expeditionary Force during the First World War.  Based in Guelph, Ontario, the unit began recruiting in late 1915 in Wellington County.  After sailing to England in April 1917, the battalion was absorbed into the 4th and 25th Reserve Battalions on May 7, 1917.  The 153rd  (Wellington) Battalion, CEF had one Officer Commanding: Lieut-Col. R. T. Pritchard. He died near his hometown of Fergus in 1955 and is interred at Belsyde Cemetery.

References
Meek, John F. Over the Top! The Canadian Infantry in the First World War. Orangeville, Ont.: The Author, 1971.

External links
The men of the 153rd are listed here:   
153rd (Wellington) Battalion C.E.F.
1915 - 1919
 http://153rdwellington.com/153rd.html

Battalions of the Canadian Expeditionary Force